Clarkey is the nickname of:

 Justin Clarke (born 1993), former Australian rules footballer
 Michael Clarke (cricketer) (born 1981), Australian cricketer
 Rikki Clarke (born 1981), English cricketer
 Mary Elizabeth Mohl (1793-1893), British writer and salon hostess (née Clarke)

Lists of people by nickname